Crackdown is an Indian Spy thriller webseries Directed By Apoorva Lakhia starring Saqib Saleem in the lead role. All episodes premiered on Voot on 23 September 2020.

Plot 
The plot revolves around the life of a few Research and Analysis Wing (RAW) agents. RP, the top agent along with other agents plans to uncover a conspiracy that threatens the safety of India. They use one lady, Divya who is identical to Mariam who was the lover of one Militant Zaheed.

Cast
Saqib Saleem as Riyaz Pathan/RP
Shriya Pilgaonkar as Divya Shirodkar/Mariam
Mohammed Iqbal Khan as Zorawar Kalra, Garima's husband
Ankur Bhatia as Tariq
Rajesh Tailang as Ashwini Rao, RAW Chief
Waluscha De Sousa as Garima Kalra, Zorawar's wife/ Mausam Masoud, ISI Agent
Ekavali Khanna as Seema, Ashwini's wife
Saba Saudagar as Fawzia, ISI Agent
Tauqeer Alam Khan as Rajesh
Tanya Desai as Ananya, Rajesh's wife
Palak Jaiswal as Lekha, Ashwini's daughter
Vipin Bhardwaj as Bala
Mudasir Bhat as Kabir
Harry Parmar as Narang
Ram Menon as Max
Gauahar Khan as Kader Kazi
Ajay Choudhary as Hamid
Amal Sherawat as Terrorist (Police)
Rohtas Nain as Mohammad
Shreyas Zutchi as Ilham Brother 1
Akshun Vashisht as Ilham Brother 2
Arry Dabbas as Mr. Chopra, Mrs. Chopra's husband
Kalpana as Mrs. Chopra, Mr. Chopra's wife
Ashish Bhatia as Mehak, Lekha's fiance
Singh Rajni as neighbour Aunty

Episodes

Reception 
Shweta Keshri of India Today praised performance of entire cast and wrote "Saqib Saleem as Riyaz Pathan is seen flexing his muscles and going shirtless in a couple of scenes, Iqbal Khan, is seen hurling expletives as Zorawar Kalra. Shriya Pilagaonkar impresses as Divya aka Mariyam but Waluscha De Sousa turned out to the surprise package of the show. Rajesh Tailang was as usual brilliant in his part as the RAW chief." Ruchi Kaushal of Hindustan Times wrote "The success of a suspense thriller lies in its ability to offer the unexpected and Crackdown never loses its way down unnecessary twists. Unlike the emotional aspect of The Family Man, The Voot Select original doesn’t come with distractions of romance or comedy, keeping its eye firmly on thriller aspect." Ronak Kotecha of The Times of India rated 3.5 our 5 stars and wrote "The show loses steam midway as a host of characters are introduced making an already complex screenplay even more crowded. While the overall plot remains intense, too many subplots are a dampener." Nandini Ramnath of Scroll.in wrote "Determinedly preposterous and as riveting as a train wreck in slow motion, Crackdown makes short work of narrative intelligence as it rips through the terrorism thriller template." Avinash Ramachandran of Cinema Express rated 2.5 star out of 5 stars and wrote "In a series about terrorism will, of course, have good Muslims and bad ones. The angle of in-house sabotage and Islamophobia, brought in by RAW’s deputy director Zorawar (Iqbal Khan), adds some inadvertent humour, and the final resolution for this angle is even more laughable." Roktim Rajpal for Deccan Herald wrote "Crackdown opens on a mildly engaging note before flattering to deceive. The narrative lacks a sense of urgency, which makes it difficult for fans to relate to or even care about the reel action. Most of the twists, barring the one seen towards the end of the fourth episode, fall flat."

References

External links
 

2020s Indian television miniseries
Indian web series
Hindi-language web series
Indian thriller television series